Enrique Diosdado (May 6, 1910 – December 1, 1983) was a Spanish actor. He is sometimes credited as Enrique Alvarez Diosdado. Diosdado was a leading man of Argentine and Spanish films of the 1940s and 1950s. His daughter, Ana Diosdado, was a leading Spanish writer and playwright. His son, also named Enrique Álvarez-Diosdado, worked as a director and writer for several tv documentary series and films.

Selected filmography
 Blood Wedding (1938)
 The Phantom Lady (1945)
 María Rosa (1946)
 Madame Bovary (1947)
 The Cat (1947)
 Song of Dolores (1947)
 María de los Ángeles (1948)
 Dance of Fire (1949)
 Last Day (1952)
 Flight 971 (1953)
 At Five O'Clock in the Afternoon (1961)
 Searching for Monica (1962)
 Don Juan Tenorio (1952)
 Pride (1955)
 Fedra (1956)
 The Sun Comes Out Every Day (1956)
  (1963)

References

Bibliography
 Wilson, Katharina M. An Encyclopedia of Continental Women Writers, Volume 1. Taylor & Francis, 1991.

External links

1910 births
1983 deaths
Spanish male film actors
Male actors from Madrid
20th-century Spanish male actors